Hunt End is a district of Redditch in Worcestershire, England.

Saint Augustine's Catholic High School is in Hunt End, it is the only Catholic high school in the town.

Villages in Worcestershire